What's Your Mama's Name is the second studio album by American country music singer Tanya Tucker. It was released on May 21, 1973, by Columbia Records. The album was produced by Billy Sherrill and includes Tucker's first two number one country singles, "What's Your Mama's Name" and "Blood Red and Goin' Down". It was certified Gold by the RIAA in 1995 for sales of more than 500,000 copies.

Critical reception

The review published in the June 2, 1973 issue of Cashbox said, "Blood Red and Goin' Down" opens this album's B-side on a powerful note. Hot mouth harp sizzles under Tanya's dramatic delivery and then the LP takes off, rockin' and sockin' through a list of tunes that draw on rock, blues, gospel and always—back to unmistakable country. Billy Sherrill production is the icing on this cake and, of course, the Jordanaires and the Nashville Edition add oomph. Hours and hours of listening pleasure here."

Commercial performance
The album peaked at No. 4 on the US Billboard Hot Country LP's chart.

The album's first single, "What's Your Mama's Name", was released in March 1973 and peaked at No. 1 on the US Billboard Hot Country Singles chart and No. 86 on the US Billboard Hot 100. The single also peaked at No. 1 in Canada on the RPM Country Singles chart. The second single, "Blood Red and Goin' Down", was released in August 1973 and peaked at No. 1 on the US Billboard Hot Country Singles chart and No. 74 on the US Billboard Hot 100. It also peaked at No. 1 in Canada on the RPM Country Singles chart.

Track listing

Personnel
Tanya Tucker – lead vocals
Lou Bradley – engineer
The Jordanaires – background vocals
Bill McElhiney – string arrangements
Cam Mullins – string arrangements
The Nashville Edition – background vocals
Billy Sherrill – producer

Charts
Album

Singles

Certifications

References

1973 albums
Tanya Tucker albums
Albums produced by Billy Sherrill
Columbia Records albums